The Catholic University of the West (UCO; French: Université catholique de l'Ouest), known colloquially to its students as «la Catho», is a university located in Angers, France.

History 
Early in the 11th century this school became famous under the direction of Marbodus, later Bishop of Rennes, and of Ulger, later Bishop of Angers, both pupils of the renowned canonist, Fulbert de Chartres. It was enlarged in 1229 by an influx of students, many of them Englishmen, from the University of Paris, who sought in Angers a shelter from the direct control of the King of France. Angers then became a center for the study of civil law, and a "studium generale," although it was officially recognized as such by an Episcopal ordinance only in 1337. In 1364 it received from King Charles V a charter granting the same privileges as those enjoyed by the University of Orleans. It was only in 1432 that a papal bull of Pope Eugene IV added the usual colleges of Theology, Medicine and Arts to the College of Canon and Civil Law. This organization continued until the French Revolution.

After the National Assembly had granted to all freedom of teaching (July 1, 1875), the French bishops decided to found five Catholic universities, and Angers, thanks to Bishop Charles Émile Freppel, was chosen for the western portion of France, including the Dioceses of Angers, Rennes, Laval, Le Mans, Angoulême, Tours and Poitiers. The university then took the title of "Facultés Catholiques de l'Ouest." The University is regarded as one of the most prestigious private universities in France. The main campus is situated in a beautiful location in the city of Angers with more than 7,000 students. Catholic University of the West has international partnerships with more than 75 universities in the world. Starting from 2009, the university is trying to maintain international partnerships and agreements with more prestigious universities around the world.

Timeline
 1229: During a crisis with the University of Paris, some students and faculty came to the Episcopal school system of Angers.
 1242: A "studium" was created, to be the origin of the future university.
 1363: Louis I, Duke of Anjou (the region in which Angers and the university are located), obtained from his brother Charles V patent letters formally recognizing the school as a university; however, it had already been recognized as such by various kings and popes.
 At the end of the 14th century, the university in Angers had some 230 students.
 1432: The university added colleges of Theology, Medicine and the Arts, after a papal bull of Pope Eugene IV.
 1477: New buildings were constructed for the university (where the theater stands today).
 1604: The celebrated professor William Barclay became the Chair of Civil Law of the university.
 1792: The French Revolution suppressed and temporarily disbanded the university.
 1875: The Catholic University of Angers was re-founded by Monsignor Freppel. The College of Law, inaugurated at Cathedral St. Maurice on November 15, was the first of its kind in France. The other colleges reopened in the following years: Literature (1876), Sciences (1877) and Theology (1879).
 1879: The University was organized according to the catholic canon as a Catholic University by Pope Pius IX.
 1898: The School of Agriculture and Viticulture, predecessor of the current Superior School of Agriculture (ESA), was founded by 
 October 1909: The School of Commercial Sciences (ESSCA) was created.
 1947: The Foreign Center for French Language and Civilization Studies was founded.
 1950: The Technical School of Chemistry (ETSCO) was founded.
 1956: The School of Electronics of the West (ESEO) was created.
 October 22, 1993: The ceremonial first brick was laid for the new buildings of the university.
 2002: Robert Rousseau was appointed the Rector of the University.
 1 January 2008:  became Rector of the university. Bedouelle, renown for his work in literature and theology, served the Church as juror, international historian, council member and teacher.
 1 September 2012: , an economist, became Rector of the university.

Location
The university is located on nine campuses:

Organization
The university is organised into six Faculties:
 Law, Economics and Management
 Education
 Humanities
 Science
 Social and Human Science
 Theology and Religious Studies

The Centre International d'Études Françaises, located at the Angers campus, provides dedicated instruction in the French language.

In 1990, under the authority of l'Université Catholique d'Angers, the Catholic Institute of Higher Studies - ICES was opened in La Roche-sur-Yon. After three years of collaboration, the Superior Council of the Catholic University of the West awarded ICES its academic independence in 1993. François Garnier, Bishop of Luçon, became the institutional head of the establishment with the responsibility of maintaining its ecclesiastical membership. The Institute is also called the Catholic University of the Vendée. 

L'Université Catholique d'Angers is a member of the International Federation of Catholic Universities.

Notable people

Faculty
 Louis Billot (1846, in Sierck-les-Bains, Moselle – 1931) - Jesuit priest and theologian
 René Bazin (1853, in Angers – 1932) - lawyer and novelist
 Maurice Couette (1858, Tours – 1943, Angers) - physicist known for his studies of fluidity
 Pierre Fauvel (1866, in Cherbourg – 1958, in Angers) - zoologist, who specialised in the study of polychaetes
 Maurice de la Taille (1872-1933) - Catholic priest whose writings influenced the Liturgical Movement
 Fernand Charron (1884, in Châteaubriant - 1965) - physician
 Robert Corillion (1908, in Hanvec-1997) - botanist
 René Laurentin (1917-2017) - theologian
 Germain Marc'hadour (1921, in Langonnet – 2022) - Catholic priest, professor of English, founder of the journal Moreana
  (born 1941, in Clohars-Carnoët) - sociologist and ethnologist
 Pierre Grandet - (born 1954) - egyptologist
 Fred Poché (born 1960) - philosopher
 Joseph Gelfer (born 1974, in Southampton) - British researcher; specialist in masculinity 
  (born 1947, in Cairo) - education

Alumni
 Alexis-Armand Charost (1860 – 1930) - cardinal of the Roman Catholic Church, Archbishop of Rennes 
  (born 1879, in Rennes - 1952) - theologian
 Louis-Marie Billé (1938, in Fleury-les-Aubrais -2002) - Archbishop of Lyon, President of the French Council of Bishops
  (born 1909, in Angers - 2003) -  politician
 Paul Poupard (born 1930, in Bouzillé, Maine-et-Loire) - Cardinal of the Catholic Church
 Joël Mercier (born 1945, in Chaudefonds-sur-Layon) - prelate of the Roman Catholic Church
 Nora Barry Fischer (born 1951, in Homestead, Pennsylvania) - Senior United States District Judge
 Dominique-Marie David (born 1963) - prelate of the Catholic Church, Archbishop of Monaco
 Susanne Koelbl (born 1965, in Munich) - German journalist, lecturer and foreign correspondent
 Victoria, Crown Princess of Sweden (born 1977)

See also 

 List of modern universities in Europe (1801–1945)

References

External links 

 
International UCO Website
English PDF Profile

Catholic universities and colleges in France
Buildings and structures in Angers
1364 establishments in Europe
1360s establishments in France
Education in Pays de la Loire
Universities and colleges in Angers
Universities in Pays de la Loire